The 181st Pennsylvania House of Representatives District is located in Philadelphia and is represented by Malcolm Kenyatta.

District profile
The 181st Pennsylvania House of Representatives District is located in Philadelphia County. It also includes the following areas:

 Ward 05 [PART, Divisions 15, 20 and 23]
 Ward 14
 Ward 16 [PART, Divisions 06, 07, 08, 09, 10, 11, 12, 13, 14, 15, 16, 17 and 18]
 Ward 18 [PART, Divisions 01, 03, 08, 09, 13, 14, 15 and 16]
 Ward 20
 Ward 32 [PART, Divisions 05, 06, 07, 08, 09, 11 and 12]
 Ward 37 [PART, Divisions 01, 02, 03, 04, 05, 06, 07, 08, 09, 10, 11, 12, 13, 14, 17 and 21]
 Ward 47

Representatives

Recent election results

References

External links
District map from the United States Census Bureau
Pennsylvania House Legislative District Maps from the Pennsylvania Redistricting Commission.  
Population Data for District 181 from the Pennsylvania Redistricting Commission.

Government of Philadelphia
181